Manjunatha BA, LLB is a 2012 Indian Kannada-language comedy film written and directed by actor-turned-director Mohan Shankar. The film stars Jaggesh and Reema Vohra in the lead roles. The film is a remake of 2007 Malayalam film Hallo which itself was based on the 2004 movie Cellular.

Plot

Cast
 Jaggesh as Adv. Manjunatha
 Tabla Nani as Basheer
  Reema Vohra as Sneha
 Karibasavaiah
 Srinivasamurthy 
 Girija Lokesh
 Chidananda
 Spoorthi Suresh as Prakruthi
 Swastik Shankar
 Shankar Patil

Reception

Critical response 

A critic from The Times of India scored the film at 2.5 out of 5 stars and says "Reema Vora is okay. Except for Srinivasamurthy, other artistes fail to impress. Music by Vinaya Chandra and cinematography by Ashok V Raman are average". Shruti I L from DNA wrote "Making one laugh comes naturally to Jaggesh and Naani, if only director Mohan had a more interesting, engaging and well executed script to do justice to the actors. Watch the film if you are a hard core Jaggesh fan who never gives any of his films a miss!". Srikanth Srinivasa from Rediff.com scored the film at 2.5 out of 5 stars and says "Reema Vohra has done justice to her role and so has Spoorthi as Manjunatha's first girlfriend. Chandrashekar of Yeddakallu Guddadamele makes a brief appearance as the heroine's father. Though there are too many characters, which leaves one confused, Manjunatha BA LLB is a watchable film". A Sharadhaa from The New Indian Express wrote "Ashok Raman has disappointed with his camera work and there is nothing much to talk about Vinay Chandra’s music. The Verdict: When the lawyer is incapable, the judgement is never in his favour". A critic from Bangalore Mirror wrote  "Jaggesh saves bits of the film with his inimitable punchlines that are his trademark. A couple of songs are pleasing. But the background score, for the most part, is a torture. It manages to snuff out the dialogues even. The director shows lack of imagination and towards the end, the film seems to have been hurriedly wrapped up".

References

External links
 

2012 films
2010s Kannada-language films
2012 comedy films
Kannada remakes of Malayalam films
Indian comedy thriller films